Hooverphonic is a Belgian band that formed in October 1995. Though originally categorized as a trip hop group, they quickly expanded their sound to the point where they could no longer be described as a singular genre, but rather encompass alternative, electronica, electropop, rock, and a mixture of others. The band originally called themselves Hoover, but later changed their name to Hooverphonic after discovering other groups were already using the Hoover name and to avoid any legal issues with the vacuum cleaner company.

Since their formation, Hooverphonic's lineup consisted of bassist Alex Callier, guitarist Raymond Geerts, and various lead singers. Prominent ones included Liesje Sadonius (1996–1997), Geike Arnaert (1997–2008, 2020–present), Noémie Wolfs (2010–2015), and Luka Cruysberghs (2018–2020).

The band were set to represent  at the Eurovision Song Contest 2020 in Rotterdam with their song "Release Me". However, on March 18, 2020, the event was cancelled due to the COVID-19 pandemic. They instead represented Belgium in the Eurovision Song Contest 2021 with the song "The Wrong Place".

History

A New Stereophonic Sound Spectacular 
The original members of the group were vocalist Esther Lybeert, keyboardist Frank Duchêne, bassist Alex Callier, and guitarist Raymond Geerts. Lybeert recorded several demos with the group; however, she backed out of the band on the day they were to sign their contract with Sony Music. The band then brought in Liesje Sadonius to record the album. Sadonius left Hooverphonic on amicable terms shortly after the release of A New Stereophonic Sound Spectacular. Kyoko Baertsoen, singer for fellow Belgian trip hop band Lunascape, filled in for Sadonius for three months of a European tour in 1997 before Geike Arnaert was made the permanent singer later that year.

The band achieved international recognition through the inclusion of the Stereophonic track "2Wicky" on the soundtrack to Bernardo Bertolucci's 1996 film Stealing Beauty. "2Wicky" also appeared on the soundtracks of I Know What You Did Last Summer and Heights. The track's main riff is sampled from Isaac Hayes' recording of the 1960s hit "Walk On By".

Additional session musicians for Stereophonic include Eric Bosteels, a session drummer with Hooverphonic from 1997 to 1998 (replaced by Mario Goossens until 2005) and David Poltrock, a keyboard player with the group on and off from 1998 until 2005. In 1998, Hooverphonic also contributed to the Depeche Mode tribute album For the Masses with their cover of "Shake the Disease".

Blue Wonder Power Milk 
After an extensive European tour with artists such as Massive Attack, Morcheeba, and Apollo 440, and a tour opening for Fiona Apple in the United States in 1997, the band released Blue Wonder Power Milk in 1998 with 18-year-old Arnaert on vocals. A marked departure from their debut, the album is driven less by breakbeats and samples, and more by organic string elements and traditional song structures.

The single "Club Montepulciano" was a hit in native Belgium and a minor college hit in the U.S., while "Renaissance Affair" was featured in the North American commercial campaign for the new Volkswagen Vapor Beetle. "This Strange Effect" and "Eden" were both featured in American cell phone commercials: "This Strange Effect" for the Motorola SLVR, and in 2006, "Eden" for the Cingular 8525. "Eden" was also used in the 1998 slasher film I Still Know What You Did Last Summer. At the time of their release, both songs were also featured in two separate third-season episodes of La Femme Nikita. Shortly afterwards, Sarah Brightman recorded a cover of "Eden" on her 1998 album Eden. Yoko Kanno samples the opening track "Battersea" in "Cyberbird", on the Ghost in the Shell: Stand Alone Complex O.S.T. 2.

At this point, Frank Duchêne decided to quit the band: «Having made two successful albums for Sony Music with his band Hooverphonic, and after extensive touring as support for Fiona Apple, Moloko & Massive Attack, he was unhappy with the project and near the end of 1998, decided to leave.»

Early 2000s: The Magnificent Tree 
The band followed up Blue Wonder Power Milk with 2000's The Magnificent Tree, which expands on the sound of Milk with a warmer, more approachable sound. Highlights from the album are the string-laden "Out of Sight", "Mad About You", and the title track.

The same year, Hooverphonic was asked to write a song specifically for the opening ceremony of the 2000 European Football Championship, which took place in Brussels, Belgium. The result — a 12-minute-long track called "Visions" — became the theme song of the championship, and Hooverphonic's performance at the opening ceremony was heard/seen by more than 1 billion people.

On the heels of Trees success, the band became the first Belgian outfit to headline the Belgian Rock Werchter musical festival in 2001.

 2002: Hooverphonic Presents Jackie Cane 
2002 saw the group shifting gears again, this time releasing the concept album Hooverphonic Presents Jackie Cane. The album tells the story of the fictional title character, a celebrity and singer catapulted into stardom at the expense of her relationship with her twin sister. Driven to the brink of insanity by the pressures of fame, Jackie quits show business and returns home to attempt reconciliation, where her sister kills them both with a poisoned last supper.

Jackie Cane retains the dreamy elements of Hooverphonic's previous works, most notably on songs "Nirvana Blue" and "Human Interest" (which contains references to "Echoes" by Pink Floyd), but tracks like "The World Is Mine" (the first single) and "Day After Day" have a clear Broadway influence and quality to them. The album went platinum in Belgium and won the group ZAMU’s Best Pop/Rock Band and Best Album awards in 2002.

 2003: Sit Down and Listen to Hooverphonic 
In 2003, the band released an album performed live in a studio with an orchestra entitled Sit Down and Listen to Hooverphonic, featuring a selection of songs from the band’s body of work, as well as the new songs "Antarctica" and "The Last Thing I Need Is You", and a cover of Lee Hazlewood's "My Autumn’s Done Come". The band launched into an extended European tour in September 2003, performing in over 100 concert halls.

 2005: No More Sweet Music 
The band's fifth studio album, a double CD entitled No More Sweet Music/More Sweet Music, was released in December 2005. Both CDs include the same 11 tracks, however, they are all different versions.

 2006: Singles '96-'06 
In 2006 the band left Sony/BMG, complaining of lack of label support for No More Sweet Music. A best-of album (Singles '96 - '06) was released to end the relation with Sony/BMG. The band went on to work without a label.

 2007—2008: The President of the LSD Golf Club 

In an interview for the Spanish TV program Nosolomusica, Alex Callier gave some hints of a new, more psychedelic orientation for the band's forthcoming music. During a show in Moscow (October 2007), the band revealed the first single of the new album, "Expedition Impossible".

The President of the LSD Golf Club was released in October 2007 in Belgium and the Netherlands. The album was released in Europe in March 2008. Following the release, the lead singer of the band, Geike Arnaert, announced on 10 October 2008 she would be leaving the band to pursue a solo career. Arnaert had been working on solo material for a few months. The last concert Hooverphonic did with Geike was on 13 December 2008 in Tele-Club, Ekaterinburg, Russia. It was filmed by the local MTV station and was shown on Russian TV in 2009.

 2010s: The Night Before, With Orchestra, Reflection and In Wonderland 
On 4 November 2010, the new lead singer Noémie Wolfs was announced on De Laatste Show at the VRT, the Flemish public broadcasting organization.

On 29 October 2010, Hooverphonic announced a new single on their website. The videoclip showcased fourteen possible singers but only one of them, Noémie Wolfs, proved to be the real successor to Geike Arnaert. The single "The Night Before" introduced the new singer and was followed on November 26 by the release of the full-length album The Night Before. The album went platinum in Belgium soon after its release.

On 9 November 2011 they announced the re-release of their first album, A New Stereophonic Sound Spectacular.

Three more albums were released in the following years featuring Wolfs as main vocalist: the orchestral album With Orchestra and the live album With Orchestra Live in 2012, and the studio album Reflection in 2013. With Orchestra Live features orchestral renditions of songs spanning the Hooverphonic entire career performed live at the Koningin Elisabethzaal in Antwerp. The performance was also released on DVD. In 2016, all the songs from the concert were uploaded on the band's official YouTube channel in high definition. With more than 100 million views, the "Mad About You" performance is the most watched video of Hooverphonic.

On 26 March 2015, Hooverphonic announced that Wolfs would be leaving the band "in mutual agreement". The band's ninth studio album, In Wonderland (2016), featured vocals from Janie Price, Emilie Satt, Litlo Tinz, Christa Jérôme, Tjeerd Bomhof and Felix Howard. Anton Marin, of the design agency Power & Glory, who had been the band's official house illustrator and designer since their debut, released a special comic strip based on the lyrics of Hooverphonic's hit single Badaboum. 

 2020s: Looking For Stars, Eurovision Song Contest and Geike Arnaert’s return 
In April 2018, Hooverphonic introduced their new singer Luka Cruysberghs. Cruysberghs provided vocals for the band's tenth studio album Looking For Stars, anticipated by the single "Romantic".

Hooverphonic were supposed to represent  at the Eurovision Song Contest 2020 in Rotterdam with their song "Release Me". The event was cancelled because of the COVID-19 pandemic. Hooverphonic was the only Eurovision entrant for 2020 who refused to take part in the "Love Shine a Light" performance, where entrants each contributed sections of the song, although a photograph of Cruysberghs was included with the other participants making a hand heart at the end.

On 9 November 2020, Cruysberghs was abruptly fired from the band to make way for the return of Geike Arnaert. Also on the same day, they released a new version of "Mad About You" for the song's 20th anniversary.

In May 2021, the band's released their eleventh studio album overall and sixth to feature Arnaert as vocalist, Hidden Stories.

They participated at the Eurovision Song Contest 2021 with the song "The Wrong Place". They finished the contest in 19th place with 74 points.

 Band members Current members Alex Callier — bass guitar, keyboards, programming 
 Raymond Geerts — lead guitar 
 Geike Arnaert — lead vocals Former members'''
 Esther Lybeert — lead vocals 
 Frank Duchêne — keyboards 
 Liesje Sadonius — lead vocals 
 Kyoko Baertsoen — lead vocals 
 Noémie Wolfs — lead vocals 
 Luka Cruysberghs — lead vocals 

 Timeline 

 Discography 

 A New Stereophonic Sound Spectacular (1996)
 Blue Wonder Power Milk (1998)
 The Magnificent Tree (2000)
 Hooverphonic Presents Jackie Cane (2002)
 No More Sweet Music/More Sweet Music (2005)
 The President of the LSD Golf Club (2007)
 The Night Before (2010)
 Reflection (2013)
 In Wonderland (2016)
 Looking for Stars (2018)
 Hidden Stories (2021)

 Use of music in television and movies 

Hooverphonic's music has also appeared in a number of commercials and other TV series:
 "2Wicky" has appeared in numerous movies, including I Know What You Did Last Summer, Permanent Midnight, The Interview, Bernardo Bertolucci's Stealing Beauty, as well as an episode of Entourage. "2Wicky" and "Inhaler" were also featured on episodes of CSI: Crime Scene Investigation and are also on the series soundtrack.
 "Eden" is included on the soundtrack of the film I Still Know What You Did Last Summer and in episode 10 of season three of the series La Femme Nikita.
 "Renaissance Affair" and "This Strange Effect" were used in the Belgian movie Shades, as was "Shades" (the theme composed for the film). "Renaissance Affair" was also used in the US in a Volkswagen New Beetle TV ad circa 2000. Alex Callier worked as the composer for the movie. "This Strange Effect" was also used in the 20th episode of La Femme Nikita.
 "Battersea" was used in the 1999 pilot of the NBC TV series Third Watch and in the end of the show's last episode ("Goodbye to Camelot"), in 2005.
 "Mad About You" was used in the CBS TV series Cold Case, in the third-season episode "Sanctuary". The song was also featured in the film A Lot Like Love during the New Year's Eve sequence, in the 2002 film New Best Friend, and in Driven. Netflix also used this song in The Umbrella Academy season 1, episode 8 titled "I Heard a Rumor".
 "The World is Mine" was featured as the theme song of the UK television series Mile High'' (2003—2005), which follows the lives of an airline crew at the fictional UK airline "Fresh!".

References

External links 
 Hooverphonic official site
 Alex Callier’s MySpace page
 Allmusic: Hooverphonic
 Hooverphonic’s official YouTube Channel
 Hooverphonic on Last.fm

Trip hop groups
Belgian rock music groups
Belgian pop music groups
Musical groups established in 1995
Eurovision Song Contest entrants of 2020
Eurovision Song Contest entrants of 2021
Eurovision Song Contest entrants for Belgium